Fiodar Fiodaraŭ, (Fedor Ivanovich Fedorov), (June 19, 1911 – October 13, 1994) was a Soviet and Belarusian physicist, whose scientific interests ranged from optics and spectroscopy to the theory of elementary particles.

Biography 
He was born in the village Turets in Karelichy Raion, Hrodna Voblast, Belarus. He was a son of village school teachers, but his father, Ivan Michaiłavič Fiodaraŭ, later became a famous Belarusian writer.

During the Second World War, Fiodaraŭ worked in the city Kiselevsk in Novosibirsk district as an associate professor of Moscow Aviation Institute.  In 1943 he became the dean of the Physics Faculty of Belarusian State University, which resumed its work near the Skhodnia railroad station outside Moscow while Belarus was still under occupation.  He remained the dean till 1950.

He took an active part in the organization of the Institute of Physics and Mathematics of the Belarus Science Academy, and was the leader of one of the four major laboratories there (the laboratory of theoretical physics) until 1987.

Until the end of his life Fiodaraŭ was a lecturing professor in Belarusian State University.  He was also a prolific writer, and published over 400 research articles.

See also 
 Imbert–Fiodaraŭ effect

External links
Biography (in Russian)
Article about Fedorov dedicated to his 90th birthday (in Russian)

1911 births
1994 deaths
People from Karelichy District
Belarusian physicists
Soviet physicists
Academicians of the National Academy of Sciences of Belarus
Belarusian State University alumni